Stef Caers (born 5 July 1980), known professionally as Gustaph (stylised as GVSTΛPH), is a Belgian singer-songwriter, producer and vocal coach. He is set to represent Belgium in the Eurovision Song Contest 2023 in Liverpool, United Kingdom with the song "Because of You".

Biography 
Caers was born on 5 July 1980 in Leuven, Flemish Brabant. He started his musical career while studying at the Royal Conservatory of Ghent, initially using the stage name Steffen. In 2000, he scored a hit with his debut single "Gonna Lose You", which reached number 22 on the Flemish singles chart. He subsequently released a second single, titled "Sweetest Thing".

Following these releases, Caers began focusing more on songwriting and producing. He also became active as a backing vocalist, providing backing vocals for, among others, Lady Linn and Willy Sommers. In the early 2010s, he joined the band Hercules and Love Affair as one of the lead vocalists.

Caers performed as a backing vocalist for Sennek at the Eurovision Song Contest 2018 and for Hooverphonic at the Eurovision Song Contest 2021. In addition to his career as a singer, he works as a vocal coach, and as a teacher at the Royal Academy of Fine Arts (KASK) in Ghent.

In November 2022, Caers was announced as one of seven participants in Eurosong 2023, the Belgian national selection for the Eurovision Song Contest. His entry "Because of You" won the final on 14 January 2023 and is set to represent Belgium in the Eurovision Song Contest 2023 in Liverpool, United Kingdom.

Discography

Singles

As lead artist

As featured artist

Notes

References

External links 
 

1980 births
Living people
21st-century Belgian singers
Belgian LGBT singers
Belgian pop singers
Belgian record producers
Belgian singer-songwriters
English-language singers from Belgium
Eurovision Song Contest entrants for Belgium
Eurovision Song Contest entrants of 2023
Hercules and Love Affair members
Musicians from Antwerp
Musicians from Leuven
Vocal coaches